Cymbium may refer to:

Cymbium, feature of the palpal bulb of a male spider's pedipalp
Cymbium (gastropod), a genus of sea snails